Bicyclus technatis, the technatis bush brown, is a butterfly in the family Nymphalidae. It is found in Nigeria, Cameroon, Gabon, the Republic of the Congo, the Democratic Republic of the Congo and northern Angola. The habitat consists of deep forests.

References

Elymniini
Butterflies described in 1877
Butterflies of Africa
Taxa named by William Chapman Hewitson